Cumberland County is a county located in the Commonwealth of Virginia, United States. As of the 2020 census, the population was 9,675. Its county seat is Cumberland.

History 
Cumberland County was established in 1749 from Goochland County. The county is named for William Augustus, Duke of Cumberland, second son of King George II of Great Britain. Cumberland County was also home to the Fleming family, which included Judge John Fleming and his son Judge William Fleming.

From 1749 until 1777, when the eastern portion was detached to form Powhatan County, Mosby Tavern served as the county courthouse. The tavern subsequently became known as "Old Cumberland Courthouse." In 1778 the narrow triangular area bordering the southern bank of the James River was annexed from Buckingham County.

Geography

Adjacent counties
Goochland County – northeast
Powhatan County – east
Amelia County – southeast
Prince Edward County – south
Buckingham County – west
Fluvanna County – northwest

Major highways

Demographics
This rural county suffered a long decline in population from 1880 to 1970, as the number of workers needed for agriculture was reduced through mechanization. Since then its population has grown, reaching a peak in 2010 nearly equal to its 19th-century high.

2020 census

Note: the US Census treats Hispanic/Latino as an ethnic category. This table excludes Latinos from the racial categories and assigns them to a separate category. Hispanics/Latinos can be of any race.

2000 census
As of the census of 2000, there were 9,017 people, 3,528 households, and 2,487 families residing in the county.  The population density was 30 people per square mile (12/km2).  There were 4,085 housing units at an average density of 14 per square mile (5/km2).  The racial makeup of the county was 60.37% White, 37.44% Black or African American, 0.18% Native American, 0.35% Asian, 0.59% from other races, and 1.06% from two or more races. 1.66% of the population were Hispanic or Latino of any race.

There were 3,528 households, out of which 30.00% had children under the age of 18 living with them, 51.60% were married couples living together, 14.30% had a female householder with no husband present, and 29.50% were non-families. 24.80% of all households were made up of individuals, and 10.70% had someone living alone who was 65 years of age or older.  The average household size was 2.55 and the average family size was 3.03.

In the county, the population was spread out, with 24.70% under the age of 18, 7.30% from 18 to 24, 28.00% from 25 to 44, 25.10% from 45 to 64, and 14.80% who were 65 years of age or older.  The median age was 38 years. For every 100 females there were 91.00 males.  For every 100 females age 18 and over, there were 88.20 males.

The median income for a household in the county was $31,816, and the median income for a family was $37,965. Males had a median income of $28,846 versus $22,521 for females. The per capita income for the county was $15,103.  15.10% of the population and 11.90% of families were below the poverty line.  Out of the total people living in poverty, 19.60% are under the age of 18 and 16.10% are 65 or older.

Government

Board of Supervisors
District 1: Brian Stanley (Chairman)
District 2: Ronald R. Tavernier (R)
District 3: Eurika Tyree (Vice Chair)
District 4: Gene Brooks
District 5: Robert Saunders Jr.

Constitutional officers
Clerk of the Circuit Court: Deidra Martin (I)
Commissioner of the Revenue: Julie A. Phillips (I)
Commonwealth's Attorney: Wendy Deaner Hannah (I)
Sheriff: Darrell Hodges (I)
Treasurer: L.O. Pfeiffer, Jr. (I)

Cumberland County is represented by Republican Mark Peake in the Virginia Senate, Republican Thomas C. Wright, Jr. in the Virginia House of Delegates, and Republican Bob Good in the U.S. House of Representatives.

Education 
Cumberland County Public Schools serves over 1400 students in the county. The district operates Cumberland Elementary School (PreK-4), Cumberland Middle School (5-8), and Cumberland High School (9-12). The Superintendent is Dr. Chip Jones (2022).

Communities

Town
Farmville (primarily in Prince Edward County)

Unincorporated communities
Cartersville
Cumberland (a census-designated place)
Tamworth

Attractions and events 
Bear Creek Lake features overnight cabins, a lodge, permanent camp sites, and picnic shelters. Swimming and boating are allowed at the lake, and boat rentals are available. The park also has trails for hiking and running.

The  Cumberland State Forest is north of U.S. Route 60, west of State Route 45 and bordered on the west by the Willis River. The Forest has multiple purposes, including watershed protection, recreation, timber production, hunting, fishing, and applied forest research. There are two self-guided trails at Cumberland State Forest that are open for walking, hiking, horses, and mountain bikes. These are the Cumberland Multi-Use Trail (14 miles) and the Willis River Hiking Trail (16 miles). White-tailed deer, wild turkey, and bobcats are common residents of this natural area. The State forest also features five lakes which may be fished from with a Virginia State fishing license, including: Oak Hill Lake, Bear Creek Lake, Winston Lake, Arrowhead Lake, and Bonbrook Lake.

Notable people
Justice Paul Carrington (1733–1818), second member appointed of the Virginia Supreme Court. Born at "Boston Hill".
Lena Trent Gordon (1885-1935), Philadelphia-based political organizer, poet, born in Cumberland.

See also
National Register of Historic Places listings in Cumberland County, Virginia

References

External links
 Cumberland County's Official Website
 http://www.cucps.k12.va.us/ (Cumberland County Public Schools)

 
Virginia counties
1749 establishments in Virginia
Counties on the James River (Virginia)